The Mystery Rider is a lost 1928 American silent Western film serial directed by Robert J. Horner and starring William Desmond. Horner produced and released through Universal Pictures. AFI has the film listed as a five-reel feature (a possible whittled-down five-reel version of the serial).

A trailer for the film (or its episodes) survives in the Library of Congress.

Cast
 William Desmond - Winthrop Lane/The Mystery Rider
 Derelys Perdue - Grace Wentworth
 Tom London - David Manning/The Claw
 Bud Osborne - Bull Leonard
 Walter Shumway - Norman Wentworth
 Ned Bassett - The Sheriff
 Syd Saylor -
 Ben Corbett -
 Slim Lucas -
 Jack Shannon -
 Bud McClure -

Episodes
 1. The Clutching Claw
 2. Trapped
 3. The Stampede
 4. Hands Up
 5. Buried Alive
 6. The Fatal Shot
 7. Hurled Through Space
 8. Unmasked
 9. Doomed
 10. The End of the Trail

References

External links
 The Mystery Rider at IMDb.com
 

1928 films
American silent serial films
Lost Western (genre) films
Universal Pictures film serials
1928 Western (genre) films
Lost American films
1928 lost films
Silent American Western (genre) films
1920s American films